Edinburgh Commercial Historic District is a national historic district located at Edinburgh, Johnson County, Indiana. The district encompasses 48 contributing buildings in the central business district of Edinburgh. It developed between about 1854 and 1941, and includes notable examples of Italianate, Late Victorian and Classical Revival style architecture. Notable buildings include the Edinburgh Interurban Depot (1919), Mooney House (c. 1865), A. C. Thompson  / Danner Building (1854), A. C. Thompson Bank (1872), Masonic Temple (1915), IOOF Building (1888), Central Hotel / Toner House (1855), and Edinburgh Town Hall (1920).

It was listed on the National Register of Historic Places in 1991.

References

Historic districts on the National Register of Historic Places in Indiana
Italianate architecture in Indiana
Victorian architecture in Indiana
Neoclassical architecture in Indiana
Historic districts in Johnson County, Indiana
National Register of Historic Places in Johnson County, Indiana